Hoda Kotb (Hudā Quṭb; ; born August 9, 1964) is an Egyptian-American broadcast journalist, television personality, and author. She is a main co-anchor of the NBC News morning show Today and co-host of its entertainment-focused fourth hour. Kotb formerly served as a correspondent for the television news magazine program Dateline NBC.

Early life
Kotb was born in Norman, Oklahoma, and grew up in Morgantown, West Virginia, and Alexandria, Virginia. She lived in New Orleans throughout the 1990s. Kotb's parents are from Egypt. Kotb and her family lived in Egypt for a year, as well as in Nigeria.  She has a brother, Adel, and a sister, Hala. Her mother, Sameha ("Sami"), worked at the Library of Congress. Her father, Abdel Kader Kotb, was a fossil energy specialist and was listed in the Who's Who of Technology. He died at the age of 51 in 1986.

During a 92nd Street Y interview, Kotb hinted at her Muslim roots when she recounted her memories of annual summer vacations in Egypt and her veiled cousins and how her parents' migration to the United States had spared her from having to do the same:

We met our cousins who looked just like us. Some of them had the head cover on. I still remember going, 'Oh, my God. Like that could have been me.' You don't realize the gift your parents give you when you leave.

Kotb similarly indirectly spoke about her family's Muslim background in her autobiography when she described attempts at match-making by her relatives in Egypt:

During my visit, I'd be sitting on the couch and there'd come a knock-knock at the door. 'Hoda, someone's at the door for yooooouuuu ... ' Oh, Lord. 'This is Mohamed. He's from Cairo. He's studying engineering ... and he has a Mercedes.' Really? He also has on a long white man dress. Okay, call it a dishdash.

She graduated from Fort Hunt High School in 1982. She was elected homecoming queen and selected to speak at her graduating class's baccalaureate service. In her college years at Virginia Tech, Kotb was a member of Delta Delta Delta women's sorority, Beta Nu Chapter. In 1986, Kotb graduated with a Bachelor of Arts degree in broadcast journalism. Kotb was the keynote speaker at her alma mater for the 2008 Virginia Tech graduation and in her speech, played Metallica's "Enter Sandman" over her iPod. In 2010, Kotb was elected to a three-year term to the Virginia Tech Alumni Association Board of Directors.

Career

Kotb's first on-air job after college was at then-CBS affiliate WXVT in Greenville, Mississippi. Kotb then moved to ABC affiliate WQAD in Moline, Illinois as a reporter from 1988 to 1989. She became a weekend anchor and reporter at CBS affiliate WINK in Fort Myers, Florida from 1989 to 1991. From 1992 to 1998, Kotb was an anchor and reporter for CBS affiliate WWL in New Orleans, Louisiana.

In 2011, Martina McBride asked Kotb to be featured in her music video for "I'm Gonna Love You Through It," a ballad dedicated to cancer survivors.

NBC News 
Kotb officially joined NBC News in April 1998 as a correspondent for Dateline NBC and all NBC News platforms.

She was the first host of Today's first fourth-hour weekday morning broadcast at 10:00 a.m. in September 2007 and was joined by Kathie Lee Gifford as a co-host in April 2008. Gifford was later succeeded by Jenna Bush Hager in April 2019, following Gifford's departure from the show.

On February 23, 2015, Kotb began hosting a live, one-hour show twice a week on Sirius XM's Today channel, discussing casual, water cooler topics.

On January 2, 2018, Kotb was named co-anchor of Today with Savannah Guthrie after anchor Matt Lauer was terminated by NBC News following accusations of sexual misconduct. She and Guthrie had been interim co-anchors since Lauer's termination on November 29, 2017. They make up the first female anchor duo to lead the show.

Books 
In October 2010, Kotb released a New York Times bestselling autobiography, Hoda: How I Survived War Zones, Bad Hair, Cancer, and Kathie Lee.

On January 15, 2013, she released her second book, Ten Years Later: Six People Who Faced Adversity and Transformed Their Lives, in which she chronicles six stories by identifying a life-changing event in each subject's life and then revisiting each of those six people a decade later.

In 2016, Kotb released her third book, Where They Belong: The Best Decisions People Almost Never Made, which features a selection of various stories of inspiring people who "found themselves" in completely unexpected moments or unforeseen circumstances.

In October 2019, Kotb released her sixth book, I Really Needed This Today, which includes personal notes about her experiences and relationships, an assortment of quotes, and 365 sayings that she hopes inspires and uplifts readers. She released a follow-up in October 2020 titled This Just Speaks to Me, which expands on her daily reflections and includes additional personal anecdotes and quotes.

Kotb has also released her own children's books. The first one, her fourth book overall, I've Loved You Since Forever, was released in 2018, and was adapted into a lullaby by Kelly Clarkson. Her second children's book, her fifth book overall, You Are My Happy, which celebrates the things in life that bring gratitude, was released in March 2019.

Awards 
In 2002, Kotb was awarded the Edward R. Murrow Award for her reporting.

Kotb received her first Gracie Awards in 2003 and 2008.

Kotb was awarded a Headliner Award in 2004 for Dateline NBC's "Saving Dane – Adoptees Rage".

In 2006, Kotb was awarded a Peabody Award for Dateline NBC's "The Education of Ms. Groves", which earned her an additional Headliner Award in 2007, as well as the Alfred I. duPont–Columbia University Award in 2008.

In 2010, 2011, and 2012, during which Kotb was a part of the Today morning host lineup, Today won a Daytime Emmy Award for Outstanding Morning Program.

In 2015, she won a Webby Award for Online Film & Video – Public Service & Activism for her music video, "Truly Brave", which she created in collaboration with Sara Bareilles and Cyndi Lauper to raise awareness for pediatric cancer. That same year, she received an additional Gracie Award for Outstanding Host in News/Non-fiction in 2015.

In 2016, Kotb was awarded with a Gracie Award for Outstanding Host in Entertainment/Information for her SiriusXM show.

Kotb was included in Time magazine's 100 Most Influential People of 2018.

In 2019, Kotb and Gifford were awarded a Daytime Emmy Award for Outstanding Informative Talk Show Host during their time as co-hosts.

Kotb was awarded the Matrix Award in October 2021.

Personal life

Family
In 2005, Kotb married former University of New Orleans tennis coach, Burzis Kanga. The marriage ended in divorce in 2008.

Kotb began a relationship with New York financier Joel Schiffman in 2013. On November 25, 2019, Kotb announced live on Today that she was engaged to Schiffman. On January 31, 2022, Kotb announced during the fourth hour of Today (Hoda & Jenna) that she and Schiffman had ended their engagement and would focus on co-parenting as friends.

On February 21, 2017, Kotb announced on Today that she had adopted a baby girl named Haley Joy Kotb. On April 16, 2019, Kotb came on Today via phone to announce she had adopted a second baby girl named Hope Catherine Kotb.

Health
In March 2007, Kotb underwent a mastectomy and reconstructive surgery for breast cancer and has since become an advocate for breast cancer awareness. Kotb allowed Today cameras to follow her throughout her cancer battle. After she was declared cancer-free, she has continued to document and use the story on the show to raise awareness for breast cancer.

On January 6, 2022, Kotb announced she tested positive for COVID-19. Although she received two vaccine doses and a booster shot, Kotb told Today that she was experiencing mild symptoms and was feeling well while isolating at home.

Career timeline 

 1986: CBS News – news assistant Cairo, Egypt
 1986–1989: Morning anchor and general assignment reporter WQAD-TV, ABC Moline, Illinois; and anchor WXVT-TV, CBS Greenville and Greenwood, Mississippi
 1989–1991: Weekend anchor and reporter WINK-TV, CBS Fort Myers, Florida
 1992–1998: Anchor and reporter WWL-TV, CBS New Orleans, Louisiana
 1998–present: NBC News
 1998–present: NBC News National correspondent
 1998–present: Dateline NBC contributing anchor and correspondent
 2004–2008: Host of the weekly syndicated series Your Total Health 2007–present: Today 4th hour co-host (with Kathie Lee Gifford from April 2008–April 2019, Jenna Bush Hager April 2019–present)
 2007–2017: Today substitute co-anchor
 2017: Today featured co-anchor
 2018–present: Today co-anchor with Savannah Guthrie
 2018–present: Macy's Thanksgiving Day Parade host

Other appearances
 2009: Lipstick Jungle as Herself (1 episode)
 2010: 30 Rock as Herself (1 episode)
 2014: Law & Order: Special Victims Unit as Herself (2 episodes)
 2014–2017: Girlfriends' Guide to Divorce as Herself (4 episodes)
 2015: Lip Sync Battle as Herself (1 episode)
 2015: Sharknado 3: Oh Hell No! as Herself (movie)
 2015: Donny! as Herself (2 episodes)
 2016: Younger as Herself (1 episode)
 2016: Brothers Take New Orleans Celebrity judge
 2017: Nashville as Herself (1 episode)
 2017: Sharknado 5: Global Swarming as Herself (movie)
 2018: Mickey and the Roadster Racers as Miss Sweetums
 2020: The Not-Too-Late Show with Elmo as Herself/guest
 2021: Valerie's Home Cooking as Herself (1 episode) 
 2022: Marry Me as Herself (cameo)
 2022: Girls5eva as Herself (1 episode)

See also
 New Yorkers in journalism

References

External links

 Official MSNBC bio
 
 Chambers, David (March/April 2006). "Calling Helen Thomas". Saudi Aramco World''. Volume 57, Number 2
 

1964 births
Living people
20th-century American non-fiction writers
20th-century American women writers
21st-century American non-fiction writers
21st-century American women writers
21st-century American journalists
American people of Egyptian descent
Egyptian journalists
African-American journalists
American women television journalists
American television reporters and correspondents
Journalists from Virginia
Journalists from West Virginia
NBC News people
Television anchors from New Orleans
New Orleans television reporters
Peabody Award winners
People from Fairfax County, Virginia
People from Morgantown, West Virginia
Virginia Tech alumni
Writers from West Virginia
Writers from Alexandria, Virginia
American expatriates in Nigeria
20th-century African-American women writers
20th-century African-American writers
21st-century African-American women
21st-century African-American people